β-Lactoglobulin (BLG) is the major whey protein of cow and sheep's milk (~3 g/L), and is also present in many other mammalian species; a notable exception being humans. Its structure, properties and biological role have been reviewed many times. BLG is considered to be a milk allergen.

Function 

The major protein in whey is β-lactoglobulin, followed by  α-lactalbumin (β-lactoglobulin ≈⁠ ⁠65%, α-lactalbumin ≈⁠⁠ ⁠25%, serum albumin ≈⁠⁠ ⁠8%, other ≈⁠ ⁠2%). β-lactoglobulin is a lipocalin protein, and can bind many hydrophobic molecules, suggesting a role in their transport. β-lactoglobulin has also been shown to be able to bind iron via siderophores and thus might have a role in combating pathogens. Upon ingestion BLG is able to shuttle complexed iron into human immune cells,  thereby providing micronutrition to these cells and participating in immune tolerance. A homologue of β-lactoglobulin is lacking in human breast milk.

Structure 

Several variants have been identified, the main ones in the cow being labelled A and B. Because of its abundance and ease of purification, it has been subjected to a wide range of biophysical studies. Its structure has been determined several times by X-ray crystallography and NMR. β-lactoglobulin is of direct interest to the food industry since its properties can variously be advantageous or disadvantageous in dairy products and processing.

Bovine β-lactoglobulin is a relatively small protein of 162 residues, with an 18.4 kDa. In physiological conditions it is predominantly dimeric, but dissociates to a monomer below about pH 3, preserving its native state as determined by using NMR. Conversely, β-lactoglobulin also occurs in tetrameric, octameric and other multimeric aggregation forms under a variety of natural conditions.

β-Lactoglobulin solutions form gels in various conditions, when the native structure is sufficiently destabilised to allow aggregation. Under prolonged heating at low pH and low ionic strength, a transparent `fine-stranded' gel is formed, in which the protein molecules assemble into long stiff fibres.

β-Lactoglobulin is the main component of milk skin, coagulating and denaturing when the milk boils. Once denatured, the β-Lactoglobulin forms a thin gelatinous film on the surface of the milk.

Folding intermediates for this protein can be studied using light spectroscopy and denaturant. Such experiments show an unusual but important intermediate composed purely of alpha helices, despite the fact that the native structure is beta sheet. Evolution has probably selected for the helical intermediate to avoid aggregation during the folding process.

Clinical significance 

As milk is a known allergen, manufacturers in European Union need to prove the presence or absence of β-lactoglobulin to ensure their labelling satisfies the requirements of the EC Directive. Food testing laboratories can use enzyme linked immunosorbent assay methods to identify and quantify β-lactoglobulin in food products.
Though β-lactoglobulin is considered a major allergen, the protective impact of the consumption of raw milk has been shown to dependent on the protein-content of the whey fraction and thus of β-lactoglobulin. This great contrast, on the one hand an allergen and on the other protective, has now been linked with its ability to carry micronutrient. When β-lactoglobulin carried micronutrient it acted tolerogenic and protected against allergy development. However, when the loading was missing, it turned into an allergen.

Laboratory polymerization of β-lactoglobulin by microbial transglutaminase reduces its allergenicity in children and adults with an IgE-mediated cow’s milk allergy.

Cows breeding 
In 2018 it was announced that a genetically modified cows were grown. The cows had its β-Lactoglobulin producing genes removed by a zygote-mediated deletion process.

See also 

 Caseine

References 

Lipocalins
Mammalian proteins
Milk